The 2009-10 Austrian National League season was contested by seven teams, and saw EC Dornbirn win the championship. The top six teams from the regular season qualified for the playoffs. HC Innsbruck and EC Dornbirn received byes to the semifinals.

Regular season

Playoffs

Quarterfinals

Semifinals

Final

External links
Season on hockeyarchives.info

Austrian National League
2009–10 in Austrian ice hockey leagues
Austrian National League seasons